Liam Foran (born 25 April 1988) is a New Zealand former professional rugby league footballer who has played for the Cessnock Goannas in the Newcastle Rugby League Competition in Newcastle, Australia, as a  or .

Background
Liam Foran was born in Auckland, New Zealand. He is the brother of NRL player Kieran Foran.

Early years
Foran played his junior football at the Ellerslie Eagles Rugby League Football Club in the Auckland Rugby League competition. Foran went to Ellerslie Primary School before moving over to Sydney. He moved to St Ives on the North Shore of Sydney, where he teams St Ives North Public School with fellow future National Rugby League player Mitchell Pearce.

In 2001 he began high school at Marist Catholic College North Shore. He also represented the North Sydney Bears junior teams before signing with Melbourne in 2007. While attending Marist Catholic College North Shore, Foran played for the school competition representative squad, MCC (Metropolitan Catholic Colleges), leading him to NSW CCC (New South Wales Combined Catholic Colleges) and eventually 2006 Australian Schoolboys which toured England and France. During the tour he surprised some by stating his desire to replace Stacey Jones as New Zealand's long-term halfback. One year later, he made the 2007 Junior Kiwis squad and played a key part in the team defeating the Junior Kangaroos. Ironically, it was Liam's younger brother Kieran who would take a similar role barring injury, debuting in 2009, captaining the side twice & playing a crucial role in their 2014 Four Nations Title & run to the 2013 Rugby League World Cup Final.

Melbourne
In 2008 Foran joined Melbourne's Toyota Cup (Under-20s) team, and also played three first grade games for the club during the State of Origin period.

Auckland
Foran signed for the New Zealand Warriors for the 2009 NRL season, with an option for the 2010 season. However he was released by the club in June, without playing a senior game. Instead he played the first half of the season with the Auckland Vulcans in the New South Wales Cup. Foran represented the NSW Residents in 2009 against the Queensland Residents due to good form while with the Auckland Vulcans.

Sydney Roosters
After leaving the Warriors, Foran joined the Newtown Jets. He then signed for the Jets' parent club, the Sydney Roosters, for the 2010 season.

Manly-Warringah Sea Eagles
Foran signed with the Manly-Warringah Sea Eagles for the 2011 NRL season, joining his brother Kieran. Foran made his first grade début during the 2012 Manly Warringah Sea Eagles season on 9 April, replacing his younger brother in the team at  after Kieran was ruled out with a hamstring injury and made a solid contribution in helping Manly end a three-game losing streak with a 30–0 win over Penrith at Brookvale Oval.

This was his first first grade game since 2008, when he played on three occasions for the Melbourne Storm during the State of Origin Series. During that gap, he played for the Toyota Cup or NSW Cup squads for all the clubs he signed, the Melbourne Storm's Under 20's team nicknamed "The Thunderbolts", the New Zealand Warriors' reserve-grade team the Auckland Vulcans, the Sydney Roosters' reserve-grade team Newtown and the Manly-Warringah Sea Eagles NSW Cup team of the same name.

London Broncos

References

1988 births
Living people
Auckland rugby league team players
Cessnock Goannas players
New Zealand rugby league players
Manly Warringah Sea Eagles players
Wentworthville Magpies players
Melbourne Storm players
Ellerslie Eagles players
Newtown Jets NSW Cup players
Junior Kiwis players
Rugby league five-eighths
Rugby league halfbacks
Rugby league players from Auckland
Salford Red Devils players